Leslie Rush (1905 – 1987) was an American surgeon who helped revolutionize the treatment of bone fractures.

Biography
Leslie Vaughn Rush was born in Meridian, Mississippi on February 16, 1905, the third and youngest child of Dr. Jesse Hackley Rush and his wife, the former Mary Hunnicutt.

On February 15, 1915, the day before his tenth birthday, Leslie's father founded Rush's Infirmary, the first private hospital in Meridian.  Leslie would eventually follow his father, his uncle James Calvin Rush and older brother H. Lowry Rush into the medical profession.

Rush attended the Tulane University College of Medicine. At Tulane he was a member of the Sigma Alpha Epsilon and Phi Chi fraternities. He joined the staff of his father's hospital in 1927.

In 1936, Leslie made medical history when he performed the first known bone pinning in the United States.  This revolutionary treatment of bone fractures led to the development of the "Rush pin," which is still use today.
 
In 1944, Dr. Rush along with Catherine Hovious, and Dr. H.M. Ivey, superintendent of Meridian Public Schools, joined forces with Meridian Junior College and initiated the first junior college and hospital nursing program in the state of Mississippi.

He died in February 1987.

References

External links
Rush Foundation Hospital
Rush Pin, LLC

1905 births
1987 deaths
American orthopedic surgeons
People from Meridian, Mississippi
Sigma Alpha Epsilon
Tulane University School of Medicine alumni
20th-century American inventors
20th-century surgeons